The Liga Unike is a professional basketball league in Albania and Kosovo. The first inaugural season will start on 6 April 2021, and the league was praised from Turgay Demirel, president of FIBA Europe, who was present at the inauguration.

Teams
Top four teams from 2019–20 Kosovo Basketball Superleague and 2019–20 Albanian Basketball Superleague respectively will participate in the competition.

Current teams

Note: Table lists in alphabetical order.

Notes
ABSL = Albanian Basketball Superleague
KBSL = Kosovo Basketball Superleague

Former teams
On 5 April 2021, Teuta Durrës withdrew from the competition due to the inability to organize for a short time.

Regular season

Liga Unike champions

Statistical leaders

See also
Albanian Basketball Superleague
Kosovo Basketball Superleague

References

External links
 Albanian Basketball Federation
 Basketball Federation of Kosovo
 Top Sporti

Multi-national basketball leagues in Europe
2020 establishments in Europe
Sports leagues established in 2020
Basketball leagues in Albania
Basketball leagues in Kosovo